The Gloster Gauntlet was a  single-seat biplane fighter designed and produced by the British aeroplane manufacturer Gloster Aircraft in the 1930s. It was the last fighter to be operated by the Royal Air Force (RAF) to have an open cockpit, and also the penultimate biplane fighter in its service.

The Gauntlet had a somewhat lengthy development process, linking back to the S.S.18 prototype of 1929. Extensive modifications, including multiple engine changes and changes to suit varying specifications, resulted in a relatively fast fighter aircraft for the era as well as a heavy armament and favourable manoeuvrability. By mid-1933, the Gauntlet name had been applied to the type and the Air Ministry placed an initial order for 24 aircraft during September of that year. It was procured as a replacement for the Bristol Bulldog, being roughly 50 MPH faster while also being more heavily armed. In May 1935, No. 19 Squadron became the first unit to receive the Gauntlet I.

An improved model, the Gauntlet II, featuring structural improvements sourced from Gloster's new parent company, Hawker was developed during 1934; deliveries of this new model commenced in the following year. Gloster received orders for over 200 Gauntlet IIs, with the type eventually being operated by 14 RAF squadrons of RAF Fighter Command. It was used for various duties, including a  secretive series of exercises that included the first interception of an aircraft using information relayed from ground-based radar, a technique that would prove to be vital during the Second World War. However, as early as 1936, frontline squadrons begun to be reequipped with more advanced fighters, such as the Gloster Gladiator, Hawker Hurricane and Supermarine Spitfire. Gauntlets were increasingly used in secondary roles and by overseas squadrons, serving in a reduced capacity into the Second World War. The last examples were withdrawn during 1943.

Design and development

Background
The Gloster Gauntlet can be traced back to the S.S.18 prototype, which made its maiden flight during January 1929. While its performance had proven the basic design to be sound, having demonstrated a maximum speed of 189 MPH, difficulties with the Bristol Mercury IIA engine that powered the aircraft motivated Gloster to explore other powerplants, which ultimately resulted in the structurally similar Gloster S.S.19. Around this time, the Air Ministry was formulating Specification F.10/27, which called for a single-seat fighter aircraft that was to be armed with six machine guns and function as a high altitude interceptor; Henry Folland, Gloster's chief designer, opted to modify the S.S.19 to carry a heavier armament (four machine guns in the wings and two in the fuselage), in order to conform with these requirements. Extensive trials of the aircraft were conducted at RAF Martlesham Heath during late 1930, in which it was found to be free of major detects and to have superior handling to any single-seat aircraft up to that point.

Despite the S.S.19's promising performance, attitudes within the Air Staff as to what the armaments of the prospective future fighter had shifted and changes were requested. Folland decided to respond by refining the aircraft's design, such as the addition of mainwheel spats, a spatted tailwheel, and a modified tail unit with greater fin area and thus increased stability. Further modifications were made to satisfy Specification F.20/27, resulting in the Gloster S.S.19B.

By the summer of 1933, testing had progressed with the S.S.19B and plans to procure the type had advanced to the point where the Gauntlet name was assigned to the type. Having been sufficiently satisfied by the demonstrated performance, the Air Ministry opted to place an initial order via a draft production schedule for 24 Gauntlets as a replacement for one squadron of Bristol Bulldog fighters during September 1933; both the finalised specification and contract No. 285263/35 were issued to Gloster in February 1934.

Into production

During December 1934, the first production Gauntlet, K4081, was completed; on 17 December of that year, it performed its maiden flight from Gloster's Hucclecote facility. On 25 May 1935, the first two aircraft were delivered to No. 19 Squadron, while 20 of the first 24 Gauntlets had been completed by the end of the following month, the majority of which were also promptly dispatched to join No. 19 Squadron. While the type's development had been lengthy, it resulted in an aircraft that was relatively trouble-free and quickly acquired a favourable reputation.

As a result of Hawker's takeover of Gloster in 1934, there as a considerable emphasis placed upon the latter to standardise its construction and design techniques with that of its new parent company. While the Gauntlet programme had been sufficiently advanced as to make major alterations to the first production batch unfeasible, it was determined to be quite beneficial for future production batches to incorporate Hawker structural elements, largely in the rear fuselage of the aircraft, as this would reduce assembly costs as well as be easier to repair by reducing the use of welding. The revised aircraft, usually known as the Gauntlet II, led to the initial batch being retroactively referred as the Gauntlet I.

During April 1935, Gloster received contract No. 396880/35, which ordered 104 Gauntlet IIs. In September 1935, a follow-on order via contract No. 442477/35 for another 100 aircraft was issued to the company. Deliveries of the Gauntlet II commenced during May 1935, with the first examples being issued to No. 56 Squadron and No. 111 Squadron. A total of 204 Gauntlet IIs were produced in the UK.

Operational history
The first squadron to receive the Gauntlet I was No. 19 Squadron at RAF Duxford, who received their first examples during May 1935. Its performance was a clear advancement over the squadron's previous type, the Bristol Bulldog, being  faster than its predecessor; between 1935 and 1937, the Gauntlet was the fastest aircraft in operation with the RAF. Accordingly, it was procured in sufficient numbers to become the most common fighter of the service during this era.

During May 1936, the improved Gauntlet II entered service with No. 56 Squadron and No. 111 Squadron, while a further six squadrons being re-equipped with the Gauntlet by the end of the year. Beyond its typical role, the type was occasionally used for other duties, such as for meteorological and competition flights. One particularly secretive use of the Gauntlet was conducted by No. 32 (The Royal) Squadron, which participated in early trials of ground-based radar, helping to develop techniques for the direction of fighters; these exercises included the first successful radar-controlled interception, a technique that would prove invaluable during the Second World War.

In May 1937, the Gauntlet had reached the peak of its strength in the RAF, with a total of 14 Squadrons of RAF Fighter Command operating the type. By 1936 the RAF began to procure more advanced fighters, such as the Gloster Gladiator, Hawker Hurricane and Supermarine Spitfire, and these progressively replaced the Gauntlet. As a consequence, Gauntlets were typically transferred onwards to freshly-formed units, serving as their first equipment to allow them to train in advance of receiving more modern fighters. It was also decided to ship numerous Gauntlets to distant parts of the British Empire, such as to equip three RAF squadrons that were stationed in the Middle East. However, in September 1938, when the Munich Crisis threatened war with Germany, 45% of the RAF's fighter squadrons (nine squadrons) still flew the Gauntlet, with only three squadrons equipped with Hurricanes.

By the outbreak of the Second World War, all but one of the home-based Gauntlet squadrons (616 Squadron was the exception) had re-equipped with more modern fighters. However, the type remained in frontline service in the Middle East for some time; a flight of Gauntlets remained in service with No.3 Sqn of the Royal Australian Air Force (RAAF) in the Middle East when Italy declared war in 1940. These aircraft were briefly used for ground-attack operations against the Italians before being retired from operations owing to maintenance problems. In August 1940, 430 Flight RAF was formed in Sudan with a mixture of Gauntlets and Vickers Vincents in the army co-operation role during the East African campaign, with the Gauntlets carrying out bombing and strafing operations against Italian forces. Gauntlets continued in use for meteorological flights until 1943.

Seventeen Gauntlets IIs were licence-produced in Denmark, while 25 ex-RAF machines were supplied by South Africa as part of its support for Finland in 1940, which was engaged in the Winter War against the Soviet Union. Already obsolete at this point, they were used as advanced trainers by the Finns. The Finnish nickname for the Gauntlet was Kotletti (literally "cutlet").

Variants
 SS.18 : Single-seat prototype. The aircraft was fitted with a 450-hp (336-kW) Bristol Mercury IIA radial piston engine.
 SS.18A : The SS.18 was fitted with a 480 hp (358 kW) Bristol Jupiter VIIF radial piston engine.
 SS.18B : The SS.18 was later fitted with a 560 hp (418 kW) Armstrong Siddeley Panther III radial piston engine.
 SS.19 : Single-seat prototype; fitted with a Bristol Jupiter radial piston engine.
 SS.19A : The SS.19 was later fitted with two wheel spats and a single spatted tailwheel.
 SS.19B : Single-seat prototype; fitted with a 536 hp (400 kW) Bristol Jupiter VIS radial piston engine.
 Gauntlet Mk I : Single-seat fighter aircraft for the RAF; 24 built.
 Gauntlet Mk II : Single-seat fighter aircraft; modified version of the Gauntlet Mk I; 221 built.

Operators
 
 Royal Australian Air Force
 No. 3 Squadron

 Hærens Flyvetropper
 No. 1 Squadron Hærens Flyvetropper

 Finnish Air Force
 No. 30 Squadron
 No. 34 Squadron
 No. 25 Squadron
 No. 17 Squadron
 No. 35 Squadron

 Southern Rhodesian Air Force
 No. 1 Squadron

 South African Air Force
 No. 1 Squadron
 No. 2 Squadron

 Royal Air Force
 No. 6 Squadron
 No. 17 Squadron
 No. 19 Squadron
 No. 32 Squadron
 No. 33 Squadron
 No. 46 Squadron
 No. 47 Squadron
 No. 54 Squadron
 No. 56 Squadron
 No. 65 Squadron
 No. 66 Squadron
 No. 73 Squadron
 
 No. 74 Squadron
 No. 79 Squadron
 No. 80 Squadron
 No. 111 Squadron
 No. 112 Squadron
 No. 151 Squadron
 No. 213 Squadron
 No. 234 Squadron
 No. 237 Squadron
 No. 504 Squadron
 No. 601 Squadron
 No. 602 Squadron
 No. 615 Squadron
 No. 616 Squadron

Surviving aircraft

As of 2008, the only remaining airworthy Gauntlet II in the world, GT-400, is registered in Finland where it spends its summers in Kymi Airfield Aviation Museum near Kotka.

Specifications (Gauntlet Mk II)

See also

References

Notes

Citations

Bibliography
 Crawford, Alex. Bristol Bulldog, Gloster Gauntlet. Redbourn, UK: Mushroom Model Publications, 2005. .
 Green, William and Gordon Swanborough. "Annals of the Gauntlet". Air Enthusiast Quarterly, No. 2, n.d., pp. 163–176.  
 Goulding, James and Robert Jones. "Gladiator, Gauntlet, Fury, Demon".Camouflage & Markings: RAF Fighter Command Northern Europe, 1936 to 1945. London: Ducimus Books, 1971.
 James, Derek J. Gloster Aircraft since 1917. London:Putnam, 1971. .
 James, Derek N. Gloster Aircraft since 1917. London: Putnam and Company Ltd., 1987. .
 Lumsden, Alec and Owen Thetford. On Silver Wings: RAF Biplane Fighters between the Wars. London: Osprey Publishing Company, 1993. .
 Mason, Francis K. The British Fighter Since 1912. Annapolis, Maryland: Naval Institute Press, 1992. .
 Mason, Francis K. The Gloster Gauntlet (Aircraft in Profile 10). Leatherhead, Surrey, UK: Profile Publications Ltd., 1965.
 Mondey, David. The Hamlyn Concise Guide to British Aircraft of World War II. London: Aerospace Publishing, 1994. .
 Shores, Christopher. Dust Clouds in the Middle East: The Air War for East Africa, Iraq, Syria, Iran and Madagascar, 1940–1942. London: Grub Street, 1996. .
 Thetford, Owen. Aircraft of the Royal Air Force 1918–57. London: Putnam, First edition 1957.
 
 Wixey, Kenneth E. "The Gloster Gauntlet story". Aircraft Illustrated. Vol. 14 No. 1, January 1980. pp. 13–17.

External links

 Gloster Gauntlet – British Aircraft of World War II
 Hakans Aviation Page

Conventional landing gear
1930s British fighter aircraft
Gloster aircraft
Aircraft first flown in 1933
Biplanes
World War II aircraft of Finland